Blanco River may refer to:

Guatemala 
 Blanco River (San Marcos)

Honduras 
 Blanco River (Honduras)

Mexico 
 Blanco River (Veracruz)

United States
 Blanco River (Texas)
 Blanco River (Lares, Puerto Rico)
 Blanco River (Naguabo, Puerto Rico)

See also
 Río Blanco (disambiguation)
 Rivière Blanche (disambiguation)
 White River (disambiguation)